Ibrahim Al Husseini Hamadtou (born 1 July 1973), also known as Ibrahim Elhusseiny Hamadtou, is an Egyptian Para table tennis Champion, winning several honors over the years, including the silver medals in the African Para table tennis Championships in 2011 and 2013.

Hamadtou lost both his arms as the result of a train accident when he was 10. In an interview with CNN, he said, "In our village, we could only play, at that time, table tennis and soccer – that's why I played both. It was [logical] to play soccer first due to my case; then I played table tennis as a challenge."

Hamadtou has also won an appreciation award under the 6th Edition of the Mohammed bin Rashid Al Maktoum Creative Sports Award for the category of athlete who achieved success in sports despite major humanitarian challenges (category of people with special needs) after earning second place and winning the silver medal during the African Para table tennis Championships in December 2013.

He represented Egypt in the 2016 and 2020 Summer Paralympic Games in Rio de Janeiro and Tokyo.

Family
Hamadtou is married and is a father of three children.

References

External links
 
 

1973 births
Living people
Egyptian male table tennis players
Paralympic table tennis players of Egypt
Table tennis players at the 2016 Summer Paralympics
Table tennis players at the 2020 Summer Paralympics
People from Damietta
Egyptian amputees
21st-century Egyptian people